Tyrese is a given name.

Notable people with the name include

Tyrese Asante (born 2002), Dutch footballer
Tyrese Campbell (born 1999), English footballer
Tyrese Cooper (born 2000), American runner
Tyrese Dyce (born 2001), English footballer
Tyrese Fornah (born 1999), English footballer
Tyrese Francois (born 2000), Australian footballer
Tyrese Gibson (born 1978), American singer-songwriter
Tyrese Haliburton (born 2000), American basketball player
Tyrese Hunter (born 2003), American basketball player
Tyrese Johnson-Fisher (born 1999), American football player
Tyrese Karelse (born 2001), South African cricketer
Tyrese Martin (born 1999), American basketball player
Tyrese Maxey (born 2000), American basketball player
Tyrese Omotoye (born 2002), Belgian footballer
Tyrese Proctor (born 2004), Australian basketball player
Tyrese Rice (born 1987), American basketball player
Tyrese Shade (born 2000), English footballer
Tyrese Sinclair (born 2001), English footballer

Other uses
 Tyrese (album), Tyrese Gibson's 1998 debut album

See also
Tyreese, a fictional character from the comic book series The Walking Dead, portrayed by Chad Coleman in the American television series of the same name
Tyreece, a given name
Tyrece Radford (born 1999), U.S. basketball player

Masculine given names